The 1999 Advanta Championships of Philadelphia doubles was the tennis doubles event of the seventeenth edition of the Advanta Championships of Philadelphia; a WTA Tier II tournament held in Philadelphia, Pennsylvania. Elena Likhovtseva and Ai Sugiyama were the defending champions, but Sugiyama did not compete this year. Likhovtseva competed with Amanda Coetzer, but were defeated in the quarterfinals by Lisa Raymond and Rennae Stubbs.

Raymond and Stubbs went on to win the title, defeating Chanda Rubin and Sandrine Testud in the final, 6–1, 7–6.

Seeds

Draw

Qualifying

Seeds

Qualifiers
  Sandra Cacic /  Lilia Osterloh

Qualifying draw

External links
 1999 Advanta Championships of Philadelphia Draw 

Advanta Championships of Philadelphia
Advanta Championships of Philadelphia